The 1948–49 international cricket season was from September 1948 to April 1949.

Season overview

November

West Indies in India

West Indies in Pakistan

December

England in South Africa

February

West Indies in Ceylon

April

Pakistan in Ceylon

References

International cricket competitions by season
1948 in cricket
1949 in cricket